Somatochlora daviesi is a species of dragonfly in the family Corduliidae. It was first described in 1977 based on specimens from Meghalaya, India, and is also known from Nepal and Bhutan. It resembles the east Asian S. dido in its small size and lack of yellow markings on most of the abdomen. Like other species in the genus, S. davisi is predominantly dark metallic brown to green. The formerly recognised Somatochlora nepalensis is now considered to be a synonym of S. daviesi.

References

Corduliidae
Insects described in 1977